Skenea peterseni is a species of sea snail, a marine gastropod mollusk in the family Skeneidae.

Description
(Original description by Herman Friele) The height of the shell attains 2.5 mm, its diameter 2.3 mm. The shell has a somewhat depressed oblique-oval form. The white shell is solid, smooth and glossy. The four whorls are very tumid, the last one occupying ¾ of the length. The spire is conically rounded. The aperture is nearly circular. A ledge runs along the inner side of the lip, not far from the opening. There is no real umbilicus, but an umbilical split. There are microscopically lines of growth barely perceptible. The horny operculum has seven volutions.

Distribution
This species occurs in the Atlantic Ocean off northern Norway, Greenland and Iceland.

References

 Friele H., 1877: Preliminary report on the Mollusca from the Norwegian North Atlantic Expedition in 1876; Nyt Magazin for Naturvidenskaberne 23: 1–10, 1 pl.
 Gofas, S.; Le Renard, J.; Bouchet, P. (2001). Mollusca, in: Costello, M.J. et al. (Ed.) (2001). European register of marine species: a check-list of the marine species in Europe and a bibliography of guides to their identification. Collection Patrimoines Naturels, 50: pp. 180–213

External links
 

peterseni
Gastropods described in 1877